Act of Betrayal is a 1988 mini-series that was a co-production between Ireland, Australia and the US. Directed by Lawrence Gordon Clark, it stars Lisa Harrow, Elliott Gould, Patrick Bergin, Deborra-Lee Furness, and Max Cullen.

It had a budget of $6 million and was later cut down to a 117-minute TV movie.

Premise
Michael McGurk, an IRA man, turns informer and the British police send him to Australia with his family. The IRA send an American hit man, Callaghan, to assassinate him. A woman, Kathy, has an affair with both McGurk and Callaghan.

Cast
 Lisa Harrow as Eileen McGurk
 Elliott Gould as Callaghan
 Patrick Bergin as Michael McGurk
 Bryan Marshall as Kennedy
 Krister Greer as Sean McGurk
 Deborra-Lee Furness as Kathy
 Max Cullen as Quinn
 Bosco Hogan as Brady
 Oliver Maguire as IRA Chief
 Gerard McSorley as Brendon
 Stella McCusker as Eileen's Mother

Reception
Max Cullen's performance as an Australian IRA sympathiser won him an AFI Award.

References

External links

1988 television films
1988 films
Australian television films
1980s English-language films
Australian thriller films